Beaumont is a lava-flooded crater located on the southwestern shore of the Mare Nectaris on Earth's Moon. It lies to the northwest of the similarly flooded crater remnant Fracastorius. To the west is the prominent crater Catharina. The crater is named after French geologist Léonce Élie de Beaumont.

The rim of Beaumont is breached in the east, where the lava from Mare Nectaris broached the crater and flooded the interior. Now only a worn and crater-impacted outer wall remains. If the crater once possessed a central peak, it is no longer apparent. The floor contains several hills and small craters. A low ridge runs northward from the crater rim across the Mare Nectaris.

Satellite craters
By convention these features are identified on lunar maps by placing the letter on the side of the crater midpoint that is closest to Beaumont.

References

 
 
 
 
 
 
 
 
 
 
 

Impact craters on the Moon